Geertruida Hendrika (Riek) Schagen (15 November 1913 – 14 July 2008) was a Dutch stage, television and film actress well known for her role as housekeeper Saartje in the children's television series Swiebertje. Schagen was also an artist, who specialized in painting and had her own gallery, named GaleRiek.  She appeared in the 1958 film Fanfare.

Schagen died in Vorden, Gelderland, the Netherlands, on 14 July 2008 at the age of 94.

Filmography

References

External links 

  

1913 births
2008 deaths
Dutch actresses
People from Amersfoort
Dutch women painters
20th-century Dutch painters
20th-century Dutch women artists